Custom House District is a historic district in Boston, Massachusetts, located between the Fitzgerald Expressway (now Purchase St. / the Rose Fitzgerald Kennedy Greenway) and Kilby Street and South Market and High and Batterymarch Streets. Named after the 1849 Boston Custom House located on State Street, the historic district contains about seventy buildings on nearly sixteen acres in Downtown Boston, consisting of 19th-century mercantile buildings along with many early 20th-century skyscrapers, including the 1915 Custom House Tower.

The area is an early example of urban planning, in which the Broad Street Associates hired architect Charles Bulfinch in 1805 to plan the commercial development of the area south of Long Wharf and State Street, which connected the wharf to the city center.  The district includes a few Federal period buildings that were built to the standards specified by Bulfinch, but is architecturally diverse, reflecting more than century of economic development.  Visually prominent 19th-century buildings include a collection of warehouses built out granite, which marked a departure from the more usual brick construction of the period.  The State Street Block, built 1858 to a design by Gridley James Fox Bryant, is another example.

The district was added to the National Register of Historic Places in 1973.  When first listed, its historically significant buildings were limited to those of the 19th century.  An amendment to the listing in 1996 extended the period of significance to 1928, changing a number of architecturally significant early skyscrapers from non-contributing to contributing properties.

Contributing properties (partial listing)
Appleton Building (1900), 4 Liberty Square
Batterymarch Building (1928), 54–68 Batterymarch Street ; designated a Boston Landmark in 1995.
Board of Trade Building (1901), 2–22 Broad Street
Boston Custom House (1849) and Custom House Tower (1915), McKinley Square
Broad Exchange Building (1903), 88 Broad Street
Broad Street Association warehouses (c. 1805), 5–9, 63–73, 64–70, 72 & 102 Broad Street Broad Street Study Report; designated a Boston Landmark in 1983; 171–175 Milk Street
Central Wharf warehouses (1816), 146–176 Milk Street
Chase and Sanborn warehouse (1901), 141–149 Broad Street
Cunard Building (1901), 122–130 State Street
Employees Liability Building (1904), 33 Broad Street
Exchange Club Building (1893), 22 Batterymarch Street
Farlow Building (1895), 92 State Street
Fidelity Building (1915), 144–148 State Street
Flour and Grain Exchange Building, aka Boston Chamber of Commerce (1892), 177 Milk Street
India Building (1903), 74–84 State Street
Insurance Exchange Building (1923), 24–44 Broad Street
King Building (1894), 120–122 Milk Street
James Codman Building (1873), 44–48 Kilby Street
John Foster Warehouse (c. 1860), 109–133 Broad Street
Marshall Building (1910), 15–19 Broad Street
Pepperell Building (1921), 160 State Street
Rice Drystuffs Company Building (1872), 295 Franklin Street
Richards Building, aka Shaw Building (1867), 112–116 State Street
State Street Block (1857), 177–199 State Street
Telegraph Building (1903), 100–110 State Street
William Henderson Boardman Warehouse, aka Howe & French Building (c. 1857), 97–107 Broad Street

Non-contributing properties (partial listing)
75 State Street (1988)
Folio Boston, 88 Broad Street (2005)
20 Custom House Street (1988)
21 Custom House Street (1989)
Market Place Center (1985)

See also
National Register of Historic Places listings in northern Boston, Massachusetts
Long Wharf and Customhouse Block
Financial District, Boston

References

 1973 application to the US National Park Service

Historic districts in Suffolk County, Massachusetts
Financial District, Boston
National Register of Historic Places in Boston
Historic districts on the National Register of Historic Places in Massachusetts